The 2021 BBVA Open Internacional de Valencia was a professional women's tennis tournament played on outdoor clay courts. It was the first edition of the tournament which was part of the 2021 ITF Women's World Tennis Tour. It took place in Valencia, Spain between 13 and 19 September 2021.

Singles main-draw entrants

Seeds

 1 Rankings are as of 30 August 2021.

Other entrants
The following players received wildcards into the singles main draw:
  Marina Bassols Ribera
  Victoria Jiménez Kasintseva
  Ane Mintegi del Olmo
  Leyre Romero Gormaz

The following players received entry from the qualifying draw:
  Cristina Dinu
  Ángela Fita Boluda
  Andrea Gámiz
  Ilona Georgiana Ghioroaie
  Tena Lukas
  Guiomar Maristany
  Andreea Prisăcariu
  Oksana Selekhmeteva

The following players received entry as lucky losers:
  Yvonne Cavallé Reimers
  Iryna Shymanovich

Champions

Singles

  Martina Trevisan def.  Dalma Gálfi, 4–6, 6–4, 6–0

Doubles

  Ysaline Bonaventure /  Ekaterine Gorgodze def.  Ángela Fita Boluda /  Oksana Selekhmeteva, 6–2, 2–6, [10–6]

References

External links
 2021 BBVA Open Internacional de Valencia at ITFtennis.com
 Official website

2021 ITF Women's World Tennis Tour
2021 in Spanish tennis
September 2021 sports events in Spain